Michael d'Halluin (born 17 September 1990) is a French sport shooter.

He participated at the 2018 ISSF World Shooting Championships, winning a medal.

References

External links

Living people
1990 births
French male sport shooters
ISSF rifle shooters
People from Lesquin
Sportspeople from Nord (French department)